Laetifautor is a genus of sea snails, marine gastropod mollusks in the family Calliostomatidae.

Species
Species within the genus Laetifautor include:
 Laetifautor deceptus (E.A. Smith, 1898)
 Laetifautor elegans Habe, 1960
 Laetifautor fundatus Marshall, 1995
 Laetifautor rubropunctatus (A. Adams, 1851)
 Laetifautor spinulosus (Tate, 1893) 
 Laetifautor unicarinata Fischer, 1879 
Species brought into synonymy
 Laetifautor amakusaensis Habe in Azuma & Toki, 1968: synonym of  Laetifautor elegans Habe, 1960
 Laetifautor monilis (Reeve, 1863): synonym of Astele monile (Reeve, 1863)
 Laetifautor ornatissimus (Schepman, 1908): synonym of Ethminolia ornatissima (Schepman, 1908)
 Laetifautor scobinatus (Reeve, 1863): synonym of Calliostoma scobinatum (A. Adams in Reeve, 1863)
 Laetifautor simulans (Smith, 1899): synonym of Maurea simulans (B. A. Marshall, 1994)
 Laetifautor spinulosum (Tate, 1893): synonym of Laetifautor spinulosus (Tate, 1893)
 Laetifautor trepidus (Hedley, 1907): synonym of Laetifautor deceptus (E.A. Smith, 1898)

References

  Iredale, T. 1929. Queensland molluscan notes, No. 1. Memoirs of the Queensland Museum 9(3): 261–297, pls 30–31

External links
 Cotton, B. C. & Godfrey, F. K. (1935). South Australian shells (including descriptions of new genera and species). Part XIV. The South Australian Naturalist. 16(2): 13-24.

 
Calliostomatidae